Hengist is an Anglo-Saxon leader in British legend.

Hengist may also refer to:
Hengist, King of Kent, a 17th-century play about the Saxon king by Thomas Middleton
MV Hengist, a ferry formerly used in the Dover-to-Calais channel crossing
Slingsby Hengist, a British World War II glider
Hengest, a Jutish hero appearing in Beowulf and the Finnesburg Fragment, who may or may not be the same as the above king
G-AAXE Hengist, a biplane airliner built in 1931 by Handley Page
A character from the Star Trek episode Wolf in the Fold

See also
 Hengst (disambiguation)